Chestnut Street Historic District is a national historic district located at Kingston in Ulster County, New York.  The district includes 44 contributing buildings and six contributing structures.  It comprises a collection of substantial 19th and early 20th century residences on dramatic hillside sites.  It also includes the Immanuel Lutheran Church and Bruck Funeral Home.

It was listed on the National Register of Historic Places in 1985.

Lowell Things' book "The Street That Built The City" goes into great depth about Chestnut St. The street that built it or much of it is on a quiet hilltop overlooking the Hudson River a hundred miles north of New York s harbor. Chestnut Street s first resident was an engineer who helped build the Delaware and Hudson Canal, which brought millions of tons of coal from Pennsylvania to the port at Rondout to be hauled down the Hudson River on barges pulled by steamboats belonging to another Chestnut Street resident to fuel a rapidly growing New York City. Seven owners of brickyards lived on the street, and their hundreds of millions of bricks rose skyward in New York while bluestone slabs shipped from nearby Wilbur paved the city s sidewalks. The owner of the steamboat company that pushed or pulled the coal, bricks, cement and bluestone built the grandest house on the street and one of the largest mansions in the Hudson Valley, which was built almost exactly where once stood the studio of his friend, a famous painter whose close circle included one of the greatest American architects of his time and the greatest actor of his time, as well as Frederic Church, Worthington Whittredge, Sanford Gifford and other legendary artists of the Hudson River School. But The Street That Built a City is more than just a tale of city-building and rich and famous people. It is also the tale of the Irish and German immigrants and others who worked on the boats and the docks and in the brickyards, who taught school, tended shops, and doctored the sick, and whose children played in abandoned mansions and Indian caves. It is a carefully researched community history but of a community barely four blocks long. The houses they built, their occupations, the transportation they used, how they lived and played down through the generations, is all documented in detail. When Chestnut Street s first resident, James McEntee, moved to the Kingston area in 1828 to begin working as an engineer on the Delaware and Hudson Canal, the village of Rondout consisted of 5 families and a sleepy river landing. By the time McEntee died in 1887, Rondout had become a densely settled community of buildings dwellings, grocery stores (46 in all), boat repair sheds, dock buildings, bars, churches and had joined with the Village of Kingston to become the City of Kingston. Today the street that built a city is part of the Chestnut Street Historic District in Kingston, New York. Much of the former Rondout Village that Chestnut Street looked out upon from its hilltop is gone today 427 Rondout buildings were torn down between 1966 and 1970 during the misguided Urban Renewal program and even Chestnut Street s greatest mansion is also gone, but others remain, and the street s 19th-century architectural splendor is largely intact

References

National Register of Historic Places in Ulster County, New York
Historic districts on the National Register of Historic Places in New York (state)
Historic districts in Ulster County, New York
Kingston, New York